Effortless Regurgitation of Bright Red Blood is the first full-length album by Regurgitate, released in 1994 by Lowland Records. This version with the original album cover had only one copy pressed, making it sought after by many collectors. It was reissued in 1999 by Relapse Records with a different and less graphic artwork.

Track list
 "Intro: The Act of Intestinal Regurgitation" – 1:13
 "Disgorging Foetus" – 1:21
 "Confluent Macular Drug Eruption" – 0:23
 "Bullous Impetigo" – 1:22
 "Fleshfeast" – 1:05
 "Anorectal Ulceration" – 0:55
 "Vulva Fermentation" – 0:33
 "Multicystic Kidney" – 1:33
 "Mucupurulent Offal Grinder" – 0:18
 "Total Dismemberment of a Female Corpse" – 1:07
 "Carnal Cacophony" – 0:47
 "Vomit Breath" – 0:20
 "Complete Rectal Prolapse" – 1:00
 "Testicular Trauma" – 1:11
 "Genital Cancer" – 1:53
 "Malignant Tumor" – 1:20
 "Diffuse Systemic Scerosis" – 0:19
 "Owner of a Necrotic Intestine" – 0:37
 "Newborn Regurgitation" – 0:51
 "Torsion of the Testicle" – 0:32
 "Worm Eaten Rectum" – 0:50
 "Chronic Lymphatic Leukemie" – 1:23
 "Metal Ulcer" – 0:34
 "Purulent Discharge from the Urethra" – 1:10
 "Vaginal Obstriction" – 1:14
 "Cloudy, Grayish Vomitus" – 0:22
 "Fleshmangler" – 1:08
 "Splattered Brains" (Agathocles cover) – 1:00
 "Bulging Vaginal Septum" – 0:39
 "Acute Urinary Infection" – 1:08
 "Severe Necroses of the Face" – 0:22
 "Bleeding Peptic Ulcer" – 0:43
 "Face Mutilation" – 0:35
 "Extensive Ulcerative Tumor" – 0:41
 "Tumecent Foetal Fluids to Expurgate" – 0:55
 "Carbonized Bowels – 0:43
 "Effortless Regurgitation of Bright Red Blood" – 1:18

Personnel
 Rikard Jansson – vocals
 Urban Skytt – guitar
 Johan Jansson – bass
 Peter Stjärnvind – drums

References

1994 debut albums
Regurgitate (band) albums